The native form of this personal name is Rapai Ágnes. This article uses the Western name order.

Ágnes Rapai (born 13 March 1952 in Szekszárd, Hungary) is a Hungarian poet, writer, and translator.

Biography
Rapai spent her childhood in Budapest, Szekszárd, and Pécs. She graduated from the M.V. Lomonosov Moscow State University where she studied dramaturgy in 1975. Rapai has been a freelance poet and writer since 1989.

Since 2007, Rapai has been a board member of ARTISJUS (Hungarian Bureau for the Protection of Authors' Rights). She is also a member of the Belletrist Association (Szépírók Társasága), the Hungarian National Association of Creative Artists (MAOE), and the Hungarian PEN Club.

Bibliography
Rapai has published five collections of poetry in Hungary. Her works have been published in Switzerland, including collections and anthologies such as Frauenfelder Lyriktage, Poesie Agenda, and Ungarische Poeten. All her publications in German have been translated by András Sándor.

Collections

Anthologies

Awards
In 1995, Rapai received the Rosenthal Institute for Holocaust Studies Award. She was also awarded by the Hungarian Art Fund in 1996, and took the János Arany Prize in 1999.

Activities
In 1997, Rapai took part in the International Poetry Festival in Frauenfeld, Switzerland. In 1999, Hungary was the guest of honor (Schwerpunkt-country) at the Frankfurt Book Fair. Her second collection of poems in German was published for this occasion.

In 2007, Rapai participated in the ninth annual Prague International Poetry Days.

Reviews
Several publications have reviewed works by Rapai:

References

20th-century Hungarian poets
20th-century Hungarian women writers
Living people
1952 births
People from Szekszárd
Hungarian translators
Moscow State University alumni
Hungarian women poets